The Danish Life Regiment was an infantry regiment of the Royal Danish Army. On 1 January 2001 it was merged with Sjællandske Livregiment, into Gardehusarregimentet.

History
The Danish Life Regiment trace its history back to 1763 when it was raised from a mix of Danes and German mercenaries. The Regiment participated in the Slaget på Reden (1801), the Gunboat War (1807-1814), First Schleswig War (1848-1850) and Second Schleswig War (1864). The regimental flag had the battle honours Bov 1848, Slesvig 1848, Fredericia 1849, Isted 1850 and Sankelmark 1864.

In 1976 Falsterske Fodregiment was merged into the regiment and Danish Life Regiment was then responsible for four of their own and four of Falsterske Fodregiment battalions until 1982.

In 2001 the regiment, with two battalions, was merged into Gardehusarregimentet. The last two battalions were transferred to the Royal Life Guards.

Organisation
Disband units 
  1st battalion (I/DLR), Mechanized infantry Battalion from 1968.(1961-2000)   
  2nd battalion (II/DLR), Mechanized infantry Battalion from 1983. (1961-2000)  
  3rd battalion (III/DLR), Infantry Battalion. (1961-2000)           
  4th battalion (IV/DLR), Infantry Battalion. (1961-2000)
  5th Brigade Staff Company/2nd Zealand Brigade. (1976-2000) 
  5th Anti-tank Company/2nd Zealand Brigade. (1961-1974)
and from 1976 to 1981:
  1st battalion (I/FAFR), Mechanized infantry Battalion.(1975-1982)   
  2nd battalion (II/FAFR), Infantry Battalion. (1975-1982)     
  3rd battalion (III/FAFR), Infantry Battalion. (1975-1982)           
  4th battalion (IV/FAFR), Infantry Battalion. (1975-1982)

Names of the regiment

Standards

References
 Lærebog for Hærens Menige, Hærkommandoen, marts 1960

Danish Army regiments
Military units and formations established in 1763
Military units and formations disestablished in 2001